None of Us Are Getting Out of This Life Alive is a mixtape by English rapper and producer Mike Skinner, under his music project The Streets. It was released on 10 July 2020 under Island Records.

Singles
On 14 April 2020, The Streets announced the first single "Call My Phone Thinking I'm Doing Nothing Better", which features Australian artist Tame Impala. The second single "I Wish You Loved You As Much As You Love Him", which features Greentea Peng and Donae'o, was released on 4 June 2020.

Critical reception
None of Us Are Getting Out of This Life Alive was met with "generally favorable" reviews from critics. At Metacritic, which assigns a weighted average rating out of 100 to reviews from mainstream publications, this release received an average score of 77, based on 9 reviews. Aggregator Album of the Year gave the album 77 out of 100 based on a critical consensus of 11 reviews.

Track listing
Track listing adapted from Tidal

Charts

References

2020 albums
The Streets albums
Island Records albums
Albums produced by Mike Skinner (musician)